Olgierd Stański (born 4 April 1973) is a Polish athlete. He competed in the men's discus throw at the 2000 Summer Olympics.

References

1973 births
Living people
Athletes (track and field) at the 2000 Summer Olympics
Polish male discus throwers
Olympic athletes of Poland
Place of birth missing (living people)